Cerrito, officially Cerrito de la Victoria, is a barrio (neighbourhood or district) of Montevideo, Uruguay. Most of the barrio is on a hill (cerrito is Spanish for "hill") on which is the very remarkable church named Santuario Nacional del Cerrito. This hill was the seat of the temporary government of General Oribe during his siege of Montevideo.

Location
Cerrito de la Victoria borders Aires Puros to the west, Las Acacias to the north, Pérez Castellanos to the east, Bolívar and Brazo Oriental to the south.

Places of worship
 National Shrine of the Heart of Jesus (Roman Catholic)
 Parish Church of Our Lady of the Thirty-Three (Roman Catholic)

Sport
The neighbourhood has two sports clubs, who share a large rivalry; the Clásico del Cerrito is contested between Club Sportivo Cerrito and Rentistas.

See also 
Barrios of Montevideo
Gobierno del Cerrito

References

External links 
 Intendencia de Montevideo / Historia del Cerrito de la Victoria
 Revista Raíces / Historia del barrio Cerrito de la Victoria

 
Barrios of Montevideo